Mere Anne Berryman  is a New Zealand kaupapa Māori academic. She is Māori, of Ngāi Tūhoe, Ngāti Awa, and Ngāti Whare  descent and as of 2019 is a full professor at the University of Waikato.

Academic career

After a 2008 PhD titled  'Repositioning within indigenous discourses of transformation and self-determination'  at the University of Waikato, Berryman moved to the University of Waikato, rising to full professor.

In the 2016 New Year Honours, Berryman was appointed an Officer of the New Zealand Order of Merit, for services to Māori and education.

In 2017, Berryman was a finalist in the New Zealander of the Year

Selected works 
 Bishop, Russell, Mere Berryman, S. Tiakiwai, and Cath Richardson. "Te Kotahitanga: The experiences of year 9 and 10 Maori students in mainstream classrooms." Wellington, New Zealand: Ministry of Education (2003).
 Bishop, Russell, and Mere Berryman. Culture speaks: Cultural relationships and classroom learning. Huia Publishers, 2006.
 Bishop, Russell, Mere Berryman, Tom Cavanagh, and Lani Teddy. "Te kotahitanga: Addressing educational disparities facing Māori students in New Zealand." Teaching and Teacher Education 25, no. 5 (2009): 734–742.
 Bishop, Russell, Dominic O'Sullivan, and Mere Berryman. Scaling up Education Reform: Addressing the Politics of Disparity. New Zealand Council for Educational Research. PO Box 3237, Wellington 6140 New Zealand, 2010.
 Berryman, Mere, Suzanne SooHoo, and Ann Nevin, eds. Culturally responsive methodologies. Emerald Group Publishing, 2013.

References

Living people
New Zealand women academics
Year of birth missing (living people)
New Zealand Māori academics
New Zealand educational theorists
Māori language revivalists
University of Waikato alumni
Academic staff of the University of Waikato
New Zealand Māori women academics
Officers of the New Zealand Order of Merit
Ngāi Tūhoe people
Ngāti Awa people
Ngāti Whare
New Zealand women writers